Tokooos is the fourth studio album by Congolese singer Fally Ipupa. It was released on July 7, 2017, by Elektra France, Warner Music France. After having established himself as a continental superstar singer in Africa with his first three albums solos, all produced by David Monsoh, Fally now wanted to open up to the French and more generally Western record market. Ipupa will be signed in 2013 by Julien Creuzard on the AZ label (subsidiary of Universal). But in 2016, Julien Creuzard left AZ to found the new label Elektra France, Fally is now under the label Elektra France.

Recording sessions took place from 2015 to 2017, with Fally himself and a lot of french music producers. Featured guest appearances include Booba, MHD, Aya Nakamura, KeBlack, Naza, Wizkid, R. Kelly, and Shay.

Tokooos is oriented towards R&B, trap and Afropop while keeping a touch of Congolese music with traditional Congolese guitar, the master instrument of Congolese rumba. After its release and in its first months of marketing, Tokooos was well received by the European public but a little less well by its African base public who saw this album as an album "made for European peoples".

The album debuted at number twenty eight on SNEP Top Albums in July 2017, number twenty one on Ultratop. It spent a total of 23 weeks on the French Top albums 200. Three years after its release, Tokooos achevied over 130 million streams on digital platforms.

Background 
In April 2013, few days after releasing his third opus, Power "Kosa Leka", a rumba album much more oriented towards urban music than his two previous albums (Droit Chemin and Arsenal de Belles Melodies) with titles such as Sweet Life "La vie est belle", Service, Ndoki, Bruce, Fally sign a three album contract with the AZ label of the major Universal Music Group.

Before devoting himself to the realization of his first urban album, he takes care of putting forward his own label F'Victeam by publishing on May 5, 2014 a single called "Original" and to reward the members of his band who l 'have accompanied since his beginnings, he produced and directed Libre Parcours, a double album of twenty-three tracks where twenty members will have the chance to sign and sometimes perform a track. Fally will participate as a featuring on seven tracks. The album will be released on March 10, 2015.

Themes and production 
At the end of 2014, he announced that his album would be called Neti na film which literally translates to "Like in a movie", his new slogan. In October 2015, he announced a collaboration with Wizkid.

The name of the project, the cover and the tracklist are unveiled on June 13, 2017, we discover the name of the project which is Tokooos and that it consists of eighteen tracks. Tokooos stands out from his previous projects. The album is entirely urban in style with a mix of R&B, rumba, afropop and rap. Common point with his previous projects (except Power "Kosa Leka"), the album contains collaborations. The collaborations are made exclusively with black artists. We find the French rappers Booba (on the track "Kiname"), MHD for the second time (on the track "Na Lingui Yé"), the Nigerian singer Wizkid (on the track "Yakuza"), the duo KeBlack & Naza (on the track "Mannequin"), singers Shay (on "Guerrier"), Aya Nakamura (on "Bad Boy"), and American singer R. Kelly (on "Nidja"). The public criticizes him above all, for not having used Lingala enough within this project for the benefit of French and English, there are all the same three songs entirely in Lingala entitled "Posa", "Eloko Oyo" or the song "Champ" which recalls a little "Original".

Promotion and singles 
The first single, "Kiname", was released on Wednesday, December 7, 2016 and was announced on November 23, 2016 by Booba on Instagram with an extract of a few seconds where we can audition part of the instrumental. Fally will announce the release date of the song on December 4, 2016, 3 days before. The single reached 10th place for best-selling singles in its first week of operation. The clip is released on December 14, 2016 on the occasion of Fally's birthday. It will be certified gold single by SNEP on May 16, 2017.

The second clip of the project is titled "Eloko Oyo" and will be released on April 7, 2017 with its music video. The song is a cover of the title "Visa Bomengo" by the late Congolese singer Mabelé Elissi. Before being released as a studio song, it was a traditional song belonging to the Mongo ethnic group. Fally is accused of plagiarism by Elissi's musicians, which is denied by the latter's widow who claims to have officially given Fally permission to resume this song. The clip is shot in Paris and Kinshasa, the first city represents modernity and the second represents traditional culture and folklore, it is a huge success with 10 million views in a month. On June 16, 2017, while making the album available for pre-order, he released, without announcement, the "Bad Boy" clip featuring singer Aya Nakamura who will also be certified gold single by SNEP.

As part of the promotion of Tokooos, Fally Ipupa was to perform on June 22, 2017 in concert at La Cigale in Paris but his concert was canceled the day before by the Paris Police Prefecture which feared "serious disturbances to public order” due to the Combatants (opponents of the current regime in place in the DRC) who do not accept that Congolese artists perform in Europe and its diaspora, considering them as close to the Congolese government.

After the release of the project, Fally pushed the promotion to the maximum by granting interviews to french medias like Le Monde, Paris Match, to channels France 24, Africa 24, TV5 Monde, BFM TV, and to radio channels RFI, Africa n ° 1 and to a few websites like OKLM.com. Skyrock, notably devotes a week to him on Planète Rap.

Track listing

References

Fally Ipupa albums
2017 albums
Albums produced by Fally Ipupa